National figure skating championships for the 2022–23 season took place mainly from December 2022 to January 2023. They were held to crown national champions and to serve as part of the selection process for international events, such as the 2023 ISU Championships. Medals were be awarded in the disciplines of men's singles, women's singles, pairs, and ice dance. A few countries chose to organize their national championships together with their neighbors; the results were subsequently divided into national podiums.

Competitions 

Key

Senior medalists

Senior men

Senior women

Senior pairs

Senior ice dance

Junior medalists

Junior men

Junior women

Junior pairs

Junior ice dance

References 

Nationals
Nationals
Figure skating national championships